Trans North Bus & Coach is an Australian bus company operating services in North Queensland

History
Trans North Bus & Coach was founded in 1983 as one school bus run from Forrest Beach to Ingham. It expanded with the acquisition of the Forrest Bus Service and Panorama Coaches, Innisfail. Further acquisitions were made including Mission Beach Bus Service in 2003.

In June 2010, Trans North Bus & Coach was purchased by the Donric Group. It operates long-distance services from Cairns to Cooktown and Karumba.

Fleet
As at March 2020, the fleet consisted of 128 buses and coaches.

References

External links
Company website
Bus Australia gallery

Bus companies of Queensland
Bus transport in Queensland
Transport companies established in 1983
North Queensland
Australian companies established in 1983
Transport in Cairns